Sporting may refer to:
Sport, recreational games and play
Sporting (neighborhood), in Alexandria, Egypt

Sports clubs
AC Sporting, a football club from Beirut, Lebanon
Alexandria Sporting Club, a sports club from Alexandria, Egypt
Real Sporting de Gijón, a football club from Gijón, Spain
Sporting Al Riyadi Beirut, a sports club from Beirut, Lebanon
Sporting BC, a Greek professional basketball team from Athens
Sporting Charleroi, a football club from Charleroi, Belgium
Sporting Clube da Brava, a football club from Cape Verde
Sporting Clube da Covilhã, a sports club from Covilhã, Portugal
Sporting Clube de Braga, a sports club from Braga, Portugal
Sporting Clube de Goa, a sports club from Goa, India
Sporting Clube de Portugal, a sports club from Lisbon, Portugal
Sporting Cristal, a football club from Lima, Peru
Sporting Kansas City, a soccer (football) club from Kansas City, Kansas, U.S.

Obsolete euphemisms
Gambling
Prostitution
Red-light district

See also